Elizabeth Anka Vajagic is a singer and guitarist who was born in Montreal, Quebec, currently signed to noted independent label Constellation Records. She has worked with members of Godspeed You! Black Emperor and Hangedup, and has been praised among independent press publications for her dark, ethereal recordings.

Discography
Elizabeth Anka (EP) (2000, Editorial Avenue)
Stand With the Stillness of This Day (2004, Constellation Records)
Nostalgia / Pain (EP) (2005, Constellation Records)

Appears on
Song of the Silent Land (compilation) (2004, Constellation Records)

References

External links 
 Elizabeth Anka Vajagic at Constellation Records
 Elizabeth Anka Vajagic collection at the Internet Archive's live music archive

Living people
Canadian women singers
Canadian women guitarists
Musicians from Montreal
Constellation Records (Canada) artists
Year of birth missing (living people)